This is a list of people associated with Durham University, divided for user convenience into multiple subcategories. This includes alumni, those who have taught there, conducted research there or played a part in its founding.

Durham is a collegiate university, so where known and if applicable, they are shown alongside their associated college. Note that college membership was not always compulsory. Staff candidates who have read for higher degrees, like the geologist Gillian Foulger or the historian Jeremy Black, did not join a college either. Alumni who did not take up membership of a college or society are therefore listed as Unattached.

This list is divided into categories indicating the field of activity in which people have become well known. Alumni who have achieved distinction in more than one field are listed in the field in which it is felt they are most associated, or have been involved in more recently.

Durham alumni are active through organizations and events such as the annual reunions, dinners and balls. By 2009, the university claimed 67 Durham associations, ranging from international to college and sports affiliated groups, catered for the more than 109,000 living alumni.

Academics
Scientific entries who were, or are, Fellows of the Royal Society, have the Post-nominal letters FRS listed after their name

Astronomers and Physicists

 Karen Aplin – Associate Professor, University of Bristol
 David Axon (Hatfield) – Professor at the University of Hertfordshire and Rochester Institute of Technology
 Gilbert Ronald Bainbridge (Hatfield) – Wolfson Professor of Energy Studies at Newcastle University
 John Barrow FRS (Van Mildert) – Gresham Professor of Geometry (2008–2011); Templeton Prize (2006)
 Richard Christopher Carrington FRS – "Observer" at Durham University Observatory (1849–1852)
 Martyn Chamberlain – Emeritus Professor of Physics at Durham University; Master of Grey College (2003–2011)
 Emma Chapman – Dorothy Hodgkin Research Fellow at Imperial College London
 Temple Chevallier – Director of Durham University Observatory (1839–1871)
 Roger Davies – Philip Wetton Professor of Astrophysics at Oxford University; President of the Royal Astronomical Society (2010–2012)
 George Efstathiou FRS (Grad Soc) – Savilian Professor of Astronomy at Oxford University (1988–1997)
 Richard Ellis FRS – Professor of Astronomy at UCL; Gold Medal of the Royal Astronomical Society (2011)
 Keith Ellis FRS – Professor of Physics at Durham University; Dirac Medal of the IOP (2019)
 Andrew Fisher – Professor of Physics at University College London
 Carlos Frenk FRS – Ogden Professor of Fundamental Physics at Durham University
 Nigel Glover FRS (Hatfield) – Professor of Physics at Durham University
 Monica Grady (St Aidan's) – Professor of Planetary and Space Science at the Open University
 Alexander Stewart Herschel FRS – first Professor of Physics at the College of Physical Sciences
 Harold Jeffreys FRS (Armstrong) – Plumian Professor of Astronomy and Experimental Philosophy at Cambridge University (1946–1958)
 Hans Kronberger – Scientist-in-Chief of the Reactor Group at UKAEA (1962–1969); Leverhulme Medal (1969)
 Alan Martin FRS – former Head of the Physics Department at Durham; Max Born Prize (2007)
 Tom McLeish FRS – Chair of Natural Philosophy at the University of York
 M. A. Wazed Miah – Chairman of the Bangladesh Atomic Energy Commission (–1999)
 Ben Moore – Director of the Center for Theoretical Astrophysics and Cosmology at the University of Zürich; Philip Leverhulme Prize (2001)
 A. W. Pryor – Fellow of the Australian Institute of Physics; David Syme Research Prize (1964)
 George Rochester FRS (Armstrong) – British physicist known for having co-discovered, with Sir Clifford Butler, a subatomic particle called the kaon
 Brian Scarlett (Hatfield) – Professor of Chemical Technology at Delft University of Technology (1983–2000)
 Caleb Scharf – Director of the Columbia Astrobiology Center at Columbia University
 Paul Sutcliffe – Professor of Theoretical Physics at Durham University; Whitehead Prize (2006)
 Elizabeth J. Tasker – Associate Professor at Japan Aerospace Exploration Agency
 Sarah Thompson – Head of Physics Department at the University of York
 Samuel Tolansky FRS (Armstrong) – Professor of Physics at Royal Holloway College (1947–1973)
 Richard S. Ward FRS – Professor of Theoretical Physics at Durham University
 Arnold Wolfendale FRS – Emeritus Professor of Physics at Durham University; Astronomer Royal (1991–1995)

Chemists

 Cyril Clifford Addison (Hatfield) – Professor of Inorganic Chemistry at University of Nottingham (1960–78)
 Jas Pal Badyal FRS - Professor of Chemistry at Durham University; Edward Harrison Memorial Prize (1993)
 Neil Bartlett FRS (King's) – chemist best known for his discovery of noble gas compounds
 Geoffrey E. Coates – Head of the Chemistry Department at Durham University (1953–1968)
 Jacqui Cole – Head of Molecular Engineering at Cavendish Laboratory
 James Feast FRS – President of the Royal Society of Chemistry (2006–08), Royal Medal (2007)
 Rebecca Goss (Hatfield) – Professor of Organic Chemistry at University of St. Andrews
Peter J. H. Scott -  Professor of Radiology and Pharmacology at University of Michigan
 James Finlay Weir Johnston FRS – Professor in Chemistry and Mineralogy, first Durham FRS (elected 1837)
 Judith Howard FRS – Professor of Chemistry at Durham University
 Jeremy Hutson FRS – Professor of Physics and Chemistry at Durham University
 Rachel McKendry (Trevs) – Professor at London Centre for Nanotechnology
 Friedrich Paneth FRS – Professor of Chemistry at Durham, 1939–1953
 David Parker FRS – Professor of Chemistry at Durham (1992–); twice Head of Department

Classicists and Archaeologists

 John Atkinson (Hatfield) – Emeritus Professor of Classics at University of Cape Town
 Eric Birley – Master of Hatfield College (1949–1956)
 David Breeze (Castle) – Chief Inspector of Ancient Monuments for Historic Scotland (1989–2005)
 Martin Carver – Professor of Archaeology at the University of York
 Robin Coningham – Professor of Early Medieval Archaeology; UNESCO Chair in Archaeological Ethics and Practice in Cultural Heritage
 Brian Dobson (Hatfield) – Reader Emeritus of Durham University; President of the Society of Antiquaries of Newcastle
 Alan Greaves (Grey) – Lecturer in Archaeology at University of Liverpool
 William Greenwell FRS (Castle) – archaeologist, canon at Durham Cathedral
 Birgitta Hoffmann (Ustinov) – Director of the Roman Gask Project
 Michael Jarrett (Hatfield) – Professor of Archaeology at Cardiff University
 Iain MacIvor (Hatfield) – Chief Inspector of Ancient Monuments for Scotland (1980–1989)
 Charlotte Roberts - Professor of Archaeology at Durham University (since 2004)
 J. E. H. Spaul (Hatfield) – British epigrapher
 Malcolm Todd – Principal of Trevelyan College (1996–2000)
 Leslie Peter Wenham – Head of History at St. John's College, York
 Tony Wilkinson – Professor of Archaeology (2006–2014)

Computer scientists
 Sue Black – Professor of Computer Science and Technology Evangelist at Durham University
 Leslie Blackett Wilson (King's) – former Chair of Computer Science at the University of Stirling
 Keith Clark (Hatfield) – Emeritus Professor in the Department of Computing at Imperial College London
 Simon Colton – Professor of Computational Creativity at Queen Mary University of London
 Max Garagnani – Lecturer, Department of Computing, Goldsmiths University of London
 David Gavaghan (Grey) – Professor of Computational Biology at University of Oxford

Economists and Political scientists

 Ewan Anderson – Emeritus Professor of Geopolitics at Durham
 Alexander Betts - Professor of Forced Migration and International Affairs at University of Oxford
 Luiza Bialasiewicz – Jean Monnet Professor of EU External Relations at the University of Amsterdam
 Philip Booth (Hatfield) – Senior Academic Fellow at the Institute of Economic Affairs
 Thom Brooks – Professor of Law and Government; Dean of Durham Law School
 Gordon Cameron (Hatfield) – Professor of Land Economy at Cambridge University; Master of Fitzwilliam College, Cambridge (1988–1990)
 Neil Carter (Hatfield) – Professor of Politics at the University of York
 Anoush Ehteshami – Professor and Joint Director of the ESRC Centre for the Advanced Study of the Arab World, Durham
 Anthony Forster – Vice-Chancellor of the University of Essex
 Andrew Gamble (Grad Soc) – Professor of Politics at the University of Sheffield (1986–2007)
 Mark N. Katz – Professor of Government and Politics at George Mason University; William Luce Fellow (April–June 2018)
 Eduardo Mendieta – Professor at Penn State University; former fellow at Institute of Advanced Study
 Roger Scully – Professor of Political Science at Cardiff University
 Steven B. Smith (Cuths) – Professor of Political Science at Yale University; Master of Branford College (1996-2011)
 Gareth Stansfield (Hatfield) – Professor of Middle East Studies at University of Exeter
 Suha Taji-Farouki – Lecturer in Modern Islam at University of Exeter
 Giles Ji Ungpakorn – Thai dissident; Professor of Political Science at International University of Humanities and Social Sciences (Costa Rica)

Engineers and Mathematicians 

 Julian Besag FRS – Professor of Mathematics at Durham University; Guy Medal (1983)
 Ed Corrigan FRS – Professor of Mathematics at the University of York, Principal of Collingwood College (2008–11)
H. Martyn Evans – Professor in Humanities in Medicine at Durham University; Principal of Trevelyan College (2008–2019)
 Ian Fells – Emeritus Professor of Energy Conversion at Newcastle University, Michael Faraday Prize (1993)
 Ruth Gregory – Professor of Mathematics and Physics at Durham University
 Julian Higgins – Professor of Evidence Synthesis and Director of Research at the Department of Population Health Sciences 
 Frank Kelly FRS (Van Mildert) – Professor of the Mathematics of Systems in the Statistical Laboratory, University of Cambridge; Master of Christ's College, Cambridge since 2006
 Peter Kyberd (Hatfield) – Head of the School of Energy and Electrical Engineering at Portsmouth University
 Nigel Martin – Senior Lecturer in Mathematics at Durham University; Principal of Trevelyan College (2000–2008)

Geographers and Earth Scientists

 John Anthony Allan (Castle) – Professor in Geography at King's College, London; Stockholm Water Prize (2008)
 Ash Amin – Professor of Geography at Cambridge University
 Richard Arculus (Hatfield) – Professor in School of Earth Sciences at Australian National University
 Gerald Blake – Geographer and Principal of Collingwood College (1987–2001)
 Andrew Blowers (Hatfield) – Geographer known for his work on nuclear waste management
 Martin Bott FRS – Emeritus Professor in the Department of Earth Sciences; Wollaston Medal (1992)
 George Malcolm Brown FRS (Castle) – Director of the British Geological Survey; Murchison Medal (1981)
 William Campbell (College of Science) – metallographer to the U.S. Coast and Geodetic Survey
 Mike Crang – Professor of Cultural Geography at Durham University
 Sarah Curtis – Professor of Health and Risk at Durham University
 John Frederick Dewey – Professor of Geology at Oxford University (1986–2000)
 Kingsley Charles Dunham FRS (Hatfield) – Director of the British Geological Survey; winner of the Wollaston Medal
 Ghazi Falah (Hild Bede) – Geographer at University of Akron
 Gillian Foulger (Unattached) – Professor of Geophysics at Durham University; Price Medal (2005)
 Paul Lewis Hancock (Castle) – Editor of Journal of Structural Geology
 Peter Liss (Castle) – Emeritus Professor of Environmental Science at the University of East Anglia
 David Harper – Professor of Palaeontology in Earth Sciences; Principal of Van Mildert College (2011–2021)
 Arthur Holmes – Chair of Geology at the University of Edinburgh; Vetlesen Prize (1964)
Claire Horwell (Castle) - Professor of Geohealth; Plinius Medal (2020)
 Ray Hudson – Lecturer in Geography; Director of the Wolfson Research Institute (2003-2007)
 Malcolm K. Hughes (Castle) – Regents' Professor of Dendrochronology at the University of Arizona; co-producer of the hockey stick graph 
 Basil Charles King (Hatfield) – Professor of Geology at Bedford College; Bigsby Medal (1959)
 Gordon Manley – Professor of Geography at Bedford College (1948–1964); President of the Royal Meteorological Society (1945–1947)
 Stewart McPherson – TV presenter and conservationist; David Given Award for Excellence in Plant Conservation (2012)
 Frank Pasquill (Castle) – Deputy Chief Scientific Officer at the Met Office
 Roger Powell FRS – Emeritus Professor in the School of Earth Sciences at the University of Melbourne
 David Sadler (Castle) – Professor of Human Geography at the University of Liverpool
 David Vaughan (Hatfield) - Scientist at British Antarctic Survey; Lead Author of the IPCC Fourth Assessment Report
 Lawrence Wager FRS – Professor of Geology at Durham University
 Philip Woodworth (Hatfield) - Oceanographer; former Director of the Permanent Service for Mean Sea Level

Historians and Antiquarians

 Michael Aris (Cuths) – Author on Bhutanese, Tibetan and Himalayan culture and Buddhism; Lecturer in Asian history at St John's College, Oxford and later at St Antony's College, Oxford
 Jeremy Black – Professor of History at the University of Exeter
 Richard Britnell – Emeritus Professor of History at Durham University
 Bertram Colgrave (Hatfield) – Reader in English at Durham University; Editor of Early English Manuscripts in Facsimile
 Anthony Crichton-Stuart (St Chad's) – Head of Old Master Paintings at Christie's, New York
 Robin Donkin (King's) – Reader in Historical Geography in Cambridge University
 Jo Fox – Director of the Institute of Historical Research
 Roy Martin Haines (St Chad's) – Professor of Medieval History at Dalhousie University
 James Holland (St Chad's) – Popular historian, author of books on World War II
 Jean Hood – Author of maritime history
 Liz James (Van Mildert) – Professor of the History of Art at the University of Sussex
 Judith Jesch (St Aidan's) – Professor of Viking Studies at the University of Nottingham
 Clifford Kinvig (Cuths) – Senior Lecturer in War Studies at RMA Sandhurst
 Deborah Lavin – Principal of Trevelyan College (1979–95)
 Dominic Montserrat (Grey) - British egyptologist and papyrologist
 Jack Ogden – Visiting Professor of Ancient Jewellery, Material and Technology at Birmingham City University; President of the Society of Jewellery Historians (since 2018)
 George Ornsby (Castle) – Antiquarian; editor with the Surtees Society
 David Reeder (Hatfield) – Lecturer in Urban History, University of Leicester
 Nicholas Reeves (Van Mildert) – Egyptologist; Director of the Amarna Royal Tombs Project (1998–2002)
 James Rutherford -  Chair of History (1934–63) at University of Auckland
 Alec Ryrie – Professor of the History of Christianity at Durham University; Gresham Professor of Divinity
 Alan Schom (Hatfield) – Biographer of Napoleon and Napoleon III
 Peter Snowdon (Castle) – specialist in contemporary British political history; contributor to Parliamentary Brief
 Joanna Story (Trevs) – Professor of Early Medieval History at the University of Leiecester
 Michael Swanton – Emeritus Professor of Medieval History at Exeter University
 George Macaulay Trevelyan – Chancellor of Durham University (1950–57)
 Andy Wood, Professor of Social History at Durham University
 Benjamin Woolley (Cuths) – historian and biographer
 Julian Wright – Professor of History at Northumbria University; co-editor of French History

Language and Literature academics

 Kenneth Allott (Armstrong) – Kenneth Muir Professor of English at Liverpool University
 Thomas Blackburn (Hatfield) – Lecturer at College of St. Mark and St. John
 Philip Bullock – Professor of Russian Literature and Music at the University of Oxford
 Seán Burke – Reader in English at Durham University
 Paul Edwards (Hatfield) – Professor of English and African Literature at the University of Edinburgh
 Mikhail Epstein – Anglo-American and Russian literary theorist; Director of the Centre for Humanities Innovation at Durham University
 Ruth Etchells – Principal of St John's College, Durham (1979–88)
 Gary Ferguson (St Chad's) – Douglas Huntly Gordon Distinguished Professor of French at the University of Virginia
 Clifford Nelson Fyle (Hatfield) - Sierra Leonean Professor of English; wrote lyrics to the Sierra Leone National Anthem
 Eldred D. Jones – literary critic from Sierra Leone
 Malcolm Guite – author, poet (Sounding the Seasons, The Singing Bowl), priest, and singer-songwriter; current Bye-Fellow and Chaplain of Girton College, Cambridge
 Maebh Long – Irish academic, known for writings on the novelist and playwright Brian O'Nolan
 Margaret Masson – Lecturer in English, Principal of St Chad's College (2016–present)
 Patrick O'Meara – Professor of Russian and Russian history; Master of Van Mildert College (2004–11)
 Ann Moss – Professor of French at Durham University (1996–2003)
 Harold Orton (Hatfield) – Professor of English Language and Medieval English Literature, University of Leeds (1946–64)
Jennifer Smith (sociolinguist) - FRSE Professor of Sociolinguistics, University of Glasgow 
 Ida C. Ward (St Mary's) – Professor of Linguistics, known for work on African languages

Life scientists
Entries defined as having backgrounds in Biology and its various sub-disciplines e.g. Botany, Ecology, Neuroscience, Pathology etc.

 David Barker – Emeritus Professor of Zoology
 David Bellamy – Lecturer in Botany; President of The Wildlife Trusts (1995–2005)
 Kathleen Bever Blackburn (Armstrong) – botanist
 John Lawton FRS – RSPB Vice President; previously head of Natural Environment Research Council; the last chair of the Royal Commission on Environmental Pollution
 Marie Lebour – marine biologist
 Simon Parson – Regius Professor of Anatomy at University of Aberdeen (since 2018); President of the Anatomical Society (since 2019)
 Joe Smartt (Hatfield) – Reader in Biology at Southampton University (1990–1996)
 Mark A. Smith (Hatfield) – Professor of Pathology at Case Western Reserve University
 David H. Valentine - Head of Department of Botany from 1945 as Reader, then from 1950 as Professor. Subsequently at University of Manchester
 Stan Woodell (Hatfield) – Lecturer in Botany at Oxford University (1959–1988); Emeritus Fellow of Wolfson College, Oxford (1989–2004)
 Adrian Woodruffe-Peacock (Hatfield) – Ecologist; contributor to the Journal of Ecology

Philosophers and Theologians
(See  for theologians better known for their ordained ministry)

 Lewis Ayres – Professor of Catholic and Historical Theology at Durham University; Bede Chair of Catholic Theology (2009–2013)
 Charles Kingsley Barrett – Professor of Divinity at Durham University (1958–1982)
 Joan Bernard – Principal of Trevelyan College (1966–1978)
 Stephen R. L. Clark – Emeritus Professor of Philosophy at the University of Liverpool
 Dan Cohn-Sherbok – Emeritus Professor of Judaism at the University of Wales
 David E. Cooper – Emeritus Professor of Philosophy at Durham University
 Douglas Davies (St John's) – Professor in the Study of Religion at Durham
 James Dunn – Lightfoot Professor of Divinity at Durham University (1990–2003)
 Christopher Evans – Lightfoot Professor of Divinity (1959–1962)
 Stanley Eveling – Professor of Moral Philosophy at Edinburgh University
 Simon J. Gathercole (Hatfield) – Reader in New Testament Studies and Director of Studies at Fitzwilliam College, Cambridge 
 David Jasper (Hatfield and St Chad's) – Professor of Theology and Literature at the University of Glasgow
 R. W. L. Moberly – Professor of Theology and Biblical Interpretation at Durham University
 Tim Crane - Former Knightbridge Professor of Philosophy at the University of Cambridge

Physicians and Psychiatrists
 
 Ephraim Anderson FRS – bacteriologist known for his research on plasmids
 Francis Arthur Bainbridge FRS – Professor of Physiology at Durham University (1911–1915), later chair of physiology at St. Bartholomew's Hospital
 George Stewardson Brady  FRS (College of Medicine) – Professor of Natural History at the Hancock Museum (1875–1906)
 John Charles – Chief Medical Office (1950–1960)
 Thomas Dutton – dietitian and opponent of teetotalism
 Reginald Hall – endocrinologist known for his research on the thyroid gland
 William Edmund Hick – President of the Experimental Psychology Society (1958–1959)
 Tom Main – doctor, psychiatrist and psychoanalyst, coined the term Therapeutic community
 Flora Murray – doctor and suffragist, founder of Women's Hospital for Children
 Ruth Nicholson – obstetrician and gynaecologist
 Thomas Horrocks Openshaw – Victorian surgeon and recipient of a Jack the Ripper letter
 Joseph Stoddart FRS – Consultant anaesthetist at Royal Victoria Infirmary, influenced the development of Intensive Care in the UK
 John Walton, Baron Walton of Detchant – former President of British Medical Association, General Medical Council and the Royal Society of Medicine

Sociologists and Social Anthropologists

 Gëzim Alpion – Lecturer in Sociology at University of Birmingham
 Robert Burgess (Bede) – President of the British Sociological Association (1989–1991)
 Stanley Cohen – Emeritus Professor of Sociology at the London School of Economics
 Iain R. Edgar – Senior Lecturer in Social Anthropology at Durham University
 Mathew Guest - Professor of Sociology of Religion at Durham University
 Robert Hugh Layton – Emeritus Professor of Anthropology at Durham University
 Tariq Modood (Cuths) – Professor of Sociology, Politics and Public Policy at the University of Bristol (1997-); co-founder of the journal Ethnicities
 Henrietta Moore (Trevs) – William Wyse Professor of Social Anthropology (2008-2014)
 Caroline Moser – Emeritus Professor of Urban Development at University of Manchester; Senior Fellow, Brookings Institution (2004–2007)
 Sue Scott – Visiting Professor at the University of Newcastle; President of the British Sociological Association (2007–2009)
 Ian Taylor (Hatfield) – Professor of Sociology at Salford University (1989–1998); Principal of Van Mildert College (1999–2000)
 Alan Warde – Professor of Sociology at Manchester University (1999-)
 Frank Webster (Cuths) – Head of the Department of Sociology at City University London (2008–2012); Theories of the Information Society (1995)

Other academics

 Michael Alcorn – Director of the School of Music and Sonic Arts at Queen's University, Belfast
 Robert Allison – Vice-Chancellor of Loughborough University from 2012
 Roy Ascott (King's) – Founder and President of the Planetary Collegium at Plymouth University (2003–present)
 Tim Blackman – Vice-Chancellor of the University of Middlesex
 Ernest Bullock – Gardiner Professor of Music at the University of Glasgow and Principal of the Scottish National Academy of Music (1941–1952); Director of the Royal College of Music (1953–1960)
 Kenneth Calman – Vice-Chancellor of Durham University (1998–2006); Chancellor of the University of Glasgow (2006–present)
 Anne Campbell – Professor of Psychology at Durham University
 John Casken – Professor of Music at the University of Manchester (1992–2008)
 Joe Elliott – Principal of Collingwood College (2011–present) and Professor of Education at Durham (2004–present)
 Peter Evans (Cuths) – Professor of Music at Southampton University (1961–1990)
 Robert Michael Franklin, Jr. – President of Morehouse College (2007–2012)
 David Grant – Vice-Chancellor of Cardiff University (2001–2012)
 Chris Higgins (Grey) – Vice Chancellor of Durham University (2007–2014)
 George Wilberforce Kakoma – Professor of music, composer of Uganda's national anthem
 Richard Ovenden (St Chad's) – Deputy Director and Head of Special Collections at the Bodleian Library
 Hugh Pearman (St Chad's) – architecture and design critic of The Sunday Times (1986–2016)
 Octavius Pickard-Cambridge FRS (Castle) – Clergyman and arachnologist
 Frank Rhodes, President of Cornell University (1977–1995)
 Akilagpa Sawyerr – Vice-Chancellor of the University of Ghana (1985–1992)
 Charles Thorp FRS – Warden of the University
 Peter Ustinov – Chancellor of the University of Durham (1992–2004)
 Paul Wellings – Vice-Chancellor of Lancaster University (2002–2012)
 Ted Wragg (Hatfield) – Professor of Education at the University of Exeter (1978–2003)
 Zu'bi M.F. Al-Zu'bi (Ustinov) - Pro Vice-Chancellor at the University of Jordan (2013–2017); Director of Development at the University of Sydney

Business people 

 Richard Adams (St John's) – pioneer of Fair Trade and founder of Traidcraft
 Adam Applegarth (Grey) – CEO of Northern Rock bank (2001–07)
 David Arkless (Hatfield) – former president, CDI Corporation
 James Averdieck (Hild Bede) – entrepreneur known for dessert brand Gü
 John Cadman, 1st Baron Cadman – Chairman of the Anglo-Persian Oil Company
 Cecil Chao – A Hong Kong billionaire, the Chairman and owner of Cheuk Nang Holdings Ltd
 Edwin Davies, businessman and philanthropist
 Steve Easterbrook (St Chad's) – CEO of McDonald's
 Ron Emerson – founding Chairman of the British Business Bank
 Leslie Ferrar (St Mary's) – Treasurer to Charles, Prince of Wales
 James Hoffmann - co-founder of Square Mile Coffee Roasters and World Barista Champion
 Tom Hume (King's) – first Director of the Museum of London
 Herbert Loebl (King's) – co-founder of Joyce, Loebl & Company
 John Laurent Giles – yacht designer
 Sir Robert Malpas (King's) – engineer and industrialist
 Lady Edward Manners – manager of Haddon Hall and founder of Beau Bra Lingerie Company
 Ian Marchant (Hatfield) – CEO of SSE plc
 Sir Peter Ogden (Castle) – co-founder of Computacenter
 Peter Owen Edmunds (Hatfield) – telecoms entrepreneur, co-founder of Peterstar
 Richard Paniguian (Hatfield) – former vice-president, British Petroleum
 Richard Pease (Hatfield) – fund manager
 Nick Scheele (Cuths) – president and COO of the Ford Motor Company
 David Sproxton (Collingwood) – co-founder (with Peter Lord) of Aardman Animations

Judges and lawyers

Judges of the Supreme Court of the United Kingdom

Judges of the High Court of Justice

Judges in other countries

Lawyers

Broadcasters and entertainers

Actors
 Delaval Astley, 23rd Baron Hastings (Hatfield) – actor, The Archers
 Biddy Baxter (St Mary's) – TV producer (Blue Peter) and inventor of the Blue Peter badge
 Arthur Bostrom (St Chad's) – actor, early member of the Durham Revue, played Officer Crabtree in  'Allo 'Allo!
 Andrew Buchan (Cuths) – actor
 Daniel Casey (Grey) – co-star of Midsomer Murders
 Nathan Kiley – actor
 George Lazenby (Bede) – portrayed James Bond in the 1969 film On Her Majesty's Secret Service
 Alex MacQueen (Collingwood) – actor
 Adam Rayner – actor, Tyrant
 Charlotte Riley (Cuths) – actress
 Patrick Ryecart (Bede) – actor (never graduated)
 John Schwab – actor and voice artist
 Lily Travers – actress, Viceroy's House
 James Wilby (Grey) – film, television and theatre actor known for Maurice and Howards End
 Christina Wolfe – actress, The Royals
 Fenella Woolgar – actress, Bright Young Things

Comedians
 James Cary (Hatfield) – TV and radio comedy writer, Think the Unthinkable and Bluestone 42
 Tim FitzHigham (St Chad's) comedian, actor and explorer
 Ed Gamble (Hatfield) – presenter and performer, The Peacock and Gamble Podcast and Mock the Week
 Nish Kumar (Grey) – stand-up and host, The Mash Report
 Nick Mohammed (St Aidan's) – comedian and actor
 Naz Osmanoglu (Van Mildert) – British-Turkish comedian

Correspondents and Presenters
 George Alagiah (Van Mildert) – broadcaster; BBC TV News at Six since 2003
 Matthew Amroliwala (St Chad's) – BBC news presenter
 Guy de la Bédoyère (Collingwood) – British historian and broadcaster, Time Team
 Lucy Beresford (Trevs) – broadcaster, host of #MindOverMatterMondays and agony aunt on This Morning
 Lionel Blue (Grey) – rabbi, broadcaster, author; Honorary Doctor of Divinity and Fellow at Grey College
 Allan Cartner (Castle) – Continuity announcer, Border Television
 Jonny Dymond, BBC Radio presenter, former BBC Washington, Europe and Middle East Correspondent, and current BBC Royal Correspondent
 Marc Edwards – Welsh and Chinese television presenter on China Central Television
 Jonathan Gould (Hatfield) – Channel 5 television presenter of MLB on Five (1997–2008)
 Judith Hann (St Aidan's) – freelance broadcaster and writer, former Tomorrow's World presenter
 Gavin Hewitt (St John's) – Special Correspondent for BBC News
 Chris Hollins (Hild Bede) – broadcaster, sports presenter for BBC Breakfast
 Nina Hossain (Cuths) – broadcast journalist
 Gytha Hutton (Hilde and Bede) - presenter and journalist for Thames News and Meridian. 
 Catherine Jacob – Sky News journalist
 Gabby Logan (Hild Bede) – TV presenter
 Dominic Montserrat (Grey) – TV Egyptologist
 Rory Morrison (Castle) - BBC Radio 4 newsreader and continuity announcer
 Maryam Nemazee – Bloomberg presenter
 Kjartan Poskitt (Collingwood) - TV presenter and author
 Mark Pougatch (Hatfield) – BBC sports presenter and radio host
 Jonny Saunders (Collingwood) – BBC Radio 2 Sports Presenter
 David Shukman (Hatfield) – BBC correspondent
 Gareth Sibson (Castle) – writer and broadcaster
 Kate Silverton (Cuths) – Broadcast journalist
 Bill Steel – presenter and announcer, Tyne Tees Television
 Jeremy Vine (Hatfield) – BBC radio and television presenter
 Tim Willcox (St Chad's), BBC television presenter

Directors and Producers
 Simon Ardizzone – film editor and producer, Hacking Democracy
 Jamie Campbell (St John's) – documentary filmmaker; writer in the New Statesman, The Guardian and The Mail on Sunday
 Charles Mark Townshend Colville (St Chad's) – 5th Viscount Colville of Culross, BBC producer and director, elected as hereditary peer in 2011
 George Entwistle (Castle) – journalist, TV producer and former Director-General of the BBC
 John Exelby (Castle) – co-founder and editor of BBC News World Service
 Shelagh Fogarty – host of the BBC Radio 5 Live breakfast show
 Fiona Foster (Van Mildert) – television presenter of BBC Business News and ITV London Tonight
 Alastair Fothergill (Cuths) – BBC Nature producer and co-producer of The Blue Planet
 Pippa Greenwood (Trevs) – plant pathologist, appears on BBC Gardeners World
 Lorraine Heggessey (Collingwood) – controller of BBC One 2000–2004
 Sally El Hosaini (Collingwood) – filmmaker
 Cecil McGivern – Controller of BBC Television Service (1950–1957)
 Chris Terrill (Collingwood) – documentary maker, writer and adventurer

Military personnel

British Army

Royal Air Force

Royal Navy

Musicians and artists 

 Sir Thomas Allen - operatic baritone, current Chancellor of Durham University
Ralph Allwood (Van Mildert) – Director of Music at Eton College
 Marian Arkwright (Unattached) – composer, one of the first British women to receive a doctorate in music
 Frederic Austin – English baritone singer, musical teacher and composer from 1905–30
 Edward Bairstow – organist and composer in the Anglican church music tradition
 H. Hugh Bancroft – British organist and composer who was organist of five cathedrals
 Philip Best – pioneer in power electronics
 Jon Boden – English fiddle player and folk singer
 Thomas Frederick Candlyn – organist and choirmaster, St. Thomas Church, New York
 Andrew Cantrill (Hild Bede) – organist and choirmaster, St. Paul's Cathedral, Buffalo, New York
 Justin Chancellor – bassist, Tool
 King Charles – indie rock artist
 J. Michael Clarke (St Chad's) – composer and musician
 Rod Clements (Cuths) – musician in folk-rock band Lindisfarne
 (Alfred) Melville Cook – British organist and conductor
 Jonathan Darlington (Hatfield) – conductor and Music Director of Vancouver Opera
 Howard Davies (Cuths) -– theatre and television director
 Bryan Ferry – Roxy Music singer (only studied for one year before moving to Newcastle)
 Margot Fonteyn – ballet dancer, Chancellor of Durham University
 Noel Forster (King's) – British artist
Rumon Gamba - conductor, Chief Conductor of Oulu Symphony Orchestra
 Ruth Gipps – British composer, conductor, oboist and pianist
 Malcolm Goldring (Hatfield) – English conductor and oboist
 Dan "Nu:Tone" Gresham – drum and bass musician
 J. P. E. Harper-Scott – Professor of Music History and Theory at Royal Holloway, University of London
 Ted Harrison – Canadian artist
 Patrick Hawes (St Chad's) – composer and Classic FM's Composer in Residence
 Gwyneth Herbert (St Chad's) – singer-songwriter and jazz musician
 Arthur Hutchings – professor of music in Durham, author of books on Mozart's piano concertos and Jean-Philippe Rameau
 David Jennings (Castle) – composer
 John Joubert – composer of choral music
 James MacMillan (Hild Bede/Grad Soc) – Scottish composer
 Stuart MacRae (Hild Bede) – composer
 Anthony Payne (Cuths) – composer and Elgar specialist
 Giles Ramsay (St Chad's) – theatre director, producer and playwright, Fellow of St Chad's
 Michael F. Robinson – composer and musicologist, faculty member (1961-1965)
 Tom Rosenthal (Cuths) – English singer-songwriter
 Alec Roth (Hatfield) – English composer
 Malcolm Sargent – English conductor, organist and composer
 Tim "Exile" Shaw – drum and bass and IDM musician
 Robert Simpson – composer, writer, BBC producer
 Ronald Smith – English classical pianist, composer and teacher
 Alexander Talbot Rice (Cuths) – portrait artist
 Richard Terry – organist and revivalist of Tudor period music
 Alan Walker – musicologist and biographer of Franz Liszt
 John B. Williams (Van Mildert) – drum and bass musician and DJ
 George Dyer - Theatre Musical Director, Supervisor and Orchestrator

Politicians and civil servants

Cabinet of the United Kingdom
Current members of the Cabinet of the United Kingdom

Shadow Cabinet of the United Kingdom
Current members of the Shadow Cabinet of the United Kingdom

Members of the House of Commons
Excluding current members of the Cabinet and Shadow Cabinet, who are listed above, and former MPs who went on to be members of the House of Lords, who are listed below

Members of the House of Lords

Members of devolved assemblies and parliaments

Members of the European Parliament

Ambassadors and High Commissioners

Civil Service

Others

Religion

Archbishops and Primates

Bishops

{| class="wikitable sortable" style="width:100%"
! width="15%" | Name
! width="15%" | College
! width="65%" | Notes
! width="5%" |
|- valign="top"
!scope=row|
| align="center"|St Chad's
| align="center"|Bishop of Wangaratta
| align="center"|
|- valign="top"
!scope=row|
| align="center"|St John's
| align="center"|Bishop of Stockport
| align="center"|
|- valign="top"
!scope=row|
| align="center"|St Chad's
| align="center"|Bishop of Whitby (1976–1983); Bishop of Selby (1983–1991)
| align="center"|
|- valign="top"
!scope=row|
| align="center"|University
| align="center"|Bishop of Mashonaland (1911–1925)
| align="center"|<ref>"New Bishop Of Mashonaland" The Times Friday, Nov 04, 1910; pg. 13; Issue 39421; col B </ref>
|- valign="top"
!scope=row|
| align="center"|St John's
| align="center"|Bishop of Knaresborough
| align="center"|
|- valign="top"
!scope=row|
| align="center"|St Cuthbert's
| align="center"|Bishop of Barbados
| align="center"|
|- valign="top"
!scope=row|
| align="center"|St John's
| align="center"|Bishop of Warrington
| align="center"|
|- valign="top"
!scope=row|
| align="center"|Hatfield
| align="center"|Bishop of Kimberley and Kuruman
| align="center"|
|- valign="top"
!scope=row|
| align="center"|?
| align="center"|Bishop of Birkenhead
| align="center"|
|- valign="top"
!scope=row|
| align="center"|St John's
| align="center"|Bishop of Jarrow
| align="center"|
|- valign="top"
!scope=row|
| align="center"|St Chad's
| align="center"|Bishop of Penrith (1959–1966); Bishop of Carlisle (1966–1972)
| align="center"|
|- valign="top"
!scope=row|
| align="center"|St Cuthert's
| align="center"|Bishop of St Helena (1967–1973)
| align="center"|
|- valign="top"
!scope=row|
| align="center"|St Chad's
| align="center"|Bishop of Melanesia
| align="center"|
|- valign="top"
!scope=row|
| align="center"|St Chad's
| align="center"|Bishop of Blackburn (1989–2003)
| align="center"|
|- valign="top"
!scope=row|
| align="center"|St John's
| align="center"|Bishop of Sheffield (2008–2016); Bishop of Oxford (2016–)
| align="center"|
|- valign="top"
!scope=row|
| align="center"|?
| align="center"|Bishop of Sherwood (1975–1988)
| align="center"|
|- valign="top"
!scope=row|
| align="center"|Hatfield
| align="center"|Bishop of Bangor (1944–1949)
| align="center"|
|- valign="top"
!scope=row|
| align="center"|Ushaw
| align="center"|Roman Catholic Bishop of Shrewsbury (2010–)
| align="center"|
|- valign="top"
!scope=row|
| align="center"|Hatfield
| align="center"|Bishop of Derby (1988–1995)
| align="center"|
|- valign="top"
!scope=row|
| align="center"|
| align="center"|Bishop of Swindon (1994–2001)
| align="center"|
|- valign="top"
!scope=row|
| align="center"|Hatfield
| align="center"|Bishop of Aberdeen and Orkney (1883–1905)
| align="center"|
|- valign="top"
!scope=row|
| align="center"|St John's
| align="center"|Bishop of Bolton
| align="center"|
|- valign="top"
!scope=row|
| align="center"|University
| align="center"|Bishop of Portsmouth
| align="center"|
|- valign="top"
!scope=row|
| align="center"|University
| align="center"|Bishop of North Queensland (1902–1913)
| align="center"|
|- valign="top"
!scope=row|
| align="center"|St Chad's
| align="center"|Bishop of Beverley (1994–2000)
| align="center"|
|- valign="top"
!scope=row|
| align="center"|St John's
| align="center"|Bishop of Doncaster (1993–1999)
| align="center"|
|- valign="top"
!scope=row|
| align="center"|St John's
| align="center"|Bishop of Chelmsford (2004–2009)
| align="center"|
|- valign="top"
!scope=row|
| align="center"|St Chad's
| align="center"|Bishop of Burnley (2000–2014)
| align="center"|
|- valign="top"
!scope=row|
| align="center"|Hatfield
| align="center"|Bishop of Glasgow and Galloway (1974–1980)
| align="center"|
|- valign="top"
!scope=row|
| align="center"|Hatfield
| align="center"|Bishop of Accra (1908–1910)
| align="center"|
|- valign="top"
!scope=row|
| align="center"|Hatfield
| align="center"|Bishop in Cyprus and the Gulf (1997–2007)
| align="center"|
|- valign="top"
!scope=row|
| align="center"|Hatfield
| align="center"|Bishop of Bunbury (1957–1977)
| align="center"|
|- valign="top"
!scope=row|
| align="center"|Hatfield
| align="center"|Bishop of Tasmania (1919–1943)
| align="center"|
|- valign="top"
!scope=row|
| align="center"|University
| align="center"|Bishop of South Tokyo (1921–1941)
| align="center"|
|- valign="top"
!scope=row|
| align="center"|St Chad's
| align="center"|Bishop Suffragan of Warrington (1976–96)
| align="center"|
|- valign="top"
!scope=row|
| align="center"|University
| align="center"|Bishop of British Columbia (1859–1892)
| align="center"|
|- valign="top"
!scope=row|
| align="center"|Collingwood
| align="center"|Bishop of Salisbury
| align="center"|
|- valign="top"
!scope=row|
| align="center"|University
| align="center"|Bishop of Wakefield (1889–1897)
| align="center"|
|- valign="top"
!scope=row|
| align="center"|St Chad's
| align="center"|Bishop of St Andrews, Dunkeld and Dunblane (1955–1969)
| align="center"|
|- valign="top"
!scope=row|
| align="center"|Bede
| align="center"|Bishop of Croydon (1956–1977)
| align="center"|
|- valign="top"
!scope=row|
| align="center"|St Chad's
| align="center"|Bishop of Worcester (2007–)
| align="center"|
|- valign="top"
!scope=row|
| align="center"|St Chad's
| align="center"|Bishop of Woolwich (2012–2016); Bishop of Lichfield (2016–)
| align="center"|
|- valign="top"
!scope=row|
| align="center"|Hatfield
| align="center"|Bishop of Egypt (1952–1958)
| align="center"|
|- valign="top"
!scope=row|
| align="center"|Non-Collegiate
| align="center"|Bishop of Hulme (1930–1945)
| align="center"|
|- valign="top"
!scope=row|
| align="center"|Non-Collegiate
| align="center"|Bishop of Sodor and Man (1928–1942)
| align="center"|
|- valign="top"
!scope=row|
| align="center"|Hatfield
| align="center"|Bishop of Antigua (1953–1969)
| align="center"|
|- valign="top"
!scope=row|
| align="center"|St John's
| align="center"|Bishop of Stockport (2015–2019)
| align="center"|
|- valign="top"
!scope=row|
| align="center"|St John's
| align="center"|Bishop in Persia (1917–1935)
| align="center"|
|- valign="top"
!scope=row|
| align="center"|University
| align="center"|Bishop of Stepney (1957–1968)
| align="center"|
|- valign="top"
!scope=row|
| align="center"|St Chad's
| align="center"|Bishop of Taunton
| align="center"|
|- valign="top"
!scope=row|
| align="center"|St John's
| align="center"|Bishop of the Church of Uganda, serving as Assistant Bishop for Mission in the Diocese of London
| align="center"|
|- valign="top"
!scope=row|
| align="center"|St Chad's
| align="center"|Bishop of Masasi (1984–1992)
| align="center"|
|- valign="top"
!scope=row|
| align="center"|St John's
| align="center"|Bishop of Sodor and Man (2008–2016)
| align="center"|
|- valign="top"
!scope=row|
| align="center"|St John's
| align="center"|Bishop of Lancaster (2006–2017)
| align="center"|
|- valign="top"
!scope=row|
| align="center"|St Chad's
| align="center"|Bishop of Dorchester (1988–2000); Bishop of Ely (2000–2010)
| align="center"|
|- valign="top"
!scope=row|
| align="center"|Hild Bede
| align="center"|Bishop of Shrewsbury (2009–2018)
| align="center"|
|- valign="top"
!scope=row|
| align="center"|St John's
| align="center"|Bishop of Stockport (1984–1994); Bishop at Lambeth (1994–1999)
| align="center"|
|- valign="top"
!scope=row|
| align="center"|St John's
| align="center"|Bishop of Ludlow (1994–2002); Bishop of Lincoln (2002–2011)
| align="center"|
|- valign="top"
!scope=row|
| align="center"|University
| align="center"|Bishop of Kensington (1932–1942); Bishop of Southwark (1942–1959)
| align="center"|
|- valign="top"
!scope=row|
| align="center"|St Cuthbert's
| align="center"|Bishop of Stockport (2000–2007); Bishop of St Edmundsbury and Ipswich (2007–2013); Bishop at Lambeth (2013–2017); Bishop to the Forces and Bishop for the Falkland Islands (2014–2017)
| align="center"|
|- valign="top"
!scope=row|
| align="center"|St John's
| align="center"|Bishop of Jamaica (1968–1975)
| align="center"|
|- valign="top"
!scope=row|
| align="center"|Hatfield
| align="center"|Bishop of Guyana (1893–1899); Bishop of Barbados and the Windward Islands (1899–1916)
| align="center"|
|- valign="top"
!scope=row|
| align="center"|Hatfield
| align="center"|Bishop of Grahamstown (1964–1969)
| align="center"|
|- valign="top"
!scope=row|
| align="center"|St John's
| align="center"|Bishop of Bristol (1975–1985)
| align="center"|
|- valign="top"
!scope=row|
| align="center"|St John's
| align="center"|Bishop of Durham (1994–2003)
| align="center"|
|- valign="top"
!scope=row|
| align="center"|University
| align="center"|Bishop of Grafton and Armidale (1869–1893)
| align="center"|
|- valign="top"
!scope=row|
| align="center"|Hatfield
| align="center"|Bishop of Lebombo
| align="center"|
|- valign="top"
!scope=row|
| align="center"|St Chad's
| align="center"|Bishop of Chichester (2012–)
| align="center"|
|- valign="top"
!scope=row|
| align="center"|Van Mildert
| align="center"|Bishop of Newcastle (1997–2014)
| align="center"|
|- valign="top"
!scope=row|
| align="center"|St Aidan's/St John's
| align="center"|Bishop of Hull
| align="center"|
|- valign="top"
!scope=row|
| align="center"|Grey
| align="center"|Bishop of Brentwood (2014–)
| align="center"|
|- valign="top"
!scope=row|
| align="center"|Grey
| align="center"|Bishop of Kensington (2009–2015); Bishop of Southwell and Nottingham (2015–)
| align="center"|
|- valign="top"
!scope=row|
| align="center"|St John's
| align="center"|Bishop of Sheffield (2017–)
| align="center"|
|}

Archdeacons

Deans

Other clerics

 Royalty 

 Sports people 
Olympic medallists

Basketball players
 Mike Allison – basketball player for Gifu Swoops
 Monika Bosilj – Croatian basketball player
 Mollie Campbell – basketball player for Great Britain

Cricketers

 Ajaz Akhtar – Cambridgeshire cricketer
 Paul Allott (Bede) – Lancashire and England cricketer
 Caroline Atkins (Hild Bede) – England cricketer
 Colin Atkinson – former Somerset cricket captain
 Jamie Atkinson (St Mary's) – Hong Kong cricket captain
 Steve Atkinson (Bede) – Durham, the Netherlands and Hong Kong cricketer (1970s)
 David Balcombe – Hampshire cricketer
 Jonathan Batty (St Chad's) — Surrey and Gloucestershire wicket-keeper and opening batsman
 Chaitanya Bishnoi (Hatfield) – Indian cricketer
 Mark Chilton – former Lancashire captain
 Holly Colvin (St Mary's) – England cricketer; member of the current England women's cricket team; holds the record of being the youngest Test cricketer of either sex to play for England
 Nick Compton (Hatfield) – cricketer
 Matthew Creese – cricketer
 Tim Curtis (Hatfield) – England cricketer
 Lee Daggett – Cricketer
 Peter Deakin (Hatfield) – Dorset and Cambridge University cricketer
 Brian Evans (St Chad's) – Hertfordshire batsman
 Laurie Evans (St Mary's) – English cricketer
 Robert Ferley (Grey) – English cricketer
 James Foster (Collingwood) – Essex and England wicketkeeper
 Graeme Fowler (Bede) – former England and Lancashire cricketer; current coach of the MCC Centre of Excellence
 James Freeling, 7th Baronet (Castle) – represented MCC and Oxford University
 Steve Henderson (Hatfield) – Worcestershire (1977–1981), Cambridge University (1982–1983) and Glamorgan (1983–1985) all-rounder
 Simon Hughes (Castle) – writer, cricket analyst and former Middlesex and Durham bowler
 Nasser Hussain (Hild Bede) – former captain of the England cricket team
 Ben Hutton — Middlesex batsman
 Will Jefferson (Hild Bede) – former Essex country cricketer
 Douglas Lockhart – Scotland wicket-keeper
 Alex Loudon (Collingwood) – Warwickshire and England all-rounder
 Shan Masood - Pakistan Test cricketer
 Gehan Mendis (Bede) – Sussex and Lancashire cricketer
 Matt Milnes (Stephenson) – Kent seam bowler 
 Gavin Moffat (Hatfield) – Cambridge University seam bowler
 Tim O'Gorman (St Chad's) – Derbyshire batsman (1987–1996)
 Ed Pollock (Collingwood) – Warwickshire batsman (2016–2021)
 James Rowe (Hatfield) – Durham UCCE and Kent Cricket Board batsman (2002)
 Will Smith (Collingwood) – Durham batsman (2007–2013)
 Martin Speight (St Chad's) – former Durham County Cricket Club wicketkeeper
 Alexander Stead – Durham UCCE and Staffordshire cricketer
 Andrew Strauss (Hatfield) – former captain of the England Test cricket team
 Frank 'Typhoon' Tyson (Hatfield) – England fast bowler and Wisden Cricketer of the Year (1956)
 Freddie van den Bergh (Hatfield) – Surrey spin bowler
 Nathaniel Watkins (Hatfield) – Durham MCCU and Jersey cricketer
 James Wilkes-Green (Hatfield) – Durham MCCU and Guernsey cricketer
 Robbie Williams (St Mary's) – Durham MCCU and Leicestershire fast bowler
 Matthew Windows (Hild Bede) – Gloucestershire cricketer

Footballers
 
 Thomas Blyth (Armstrong) – centre forward for Newcastle United
 Eddy Brown – Coventry City and Birmingham City centre forward
 Warren Bradley (Hatfield) – Manchester United and England footballerObituary , manutd.com, URL accessed 18 May 2009
 Oliver Gill (Cuths) – footballer for Manchester United Football Club
 Michael King (St Aidan's) – former Burnley winger
 Rory Lonergan – Hong Kong FC left-back
 Matt Perrella – goalkeeper for Utica City FC
 Joe Shaw (Armstrong) – Hull City forward
 Jim Shoulder (Cuths) – Scarborough F.C. footballer
 Wouter Verstraaten (Grey) – South Shields defender
 Layla Young – footballer, Brighton & Hove Albion, Doncaster Belles and England

Field Hockey players
 Jamie Cachia (St Mary's) – goalkeeper for Scotland national team
 Fiona Crackles – represented Great Britain at the 2020 Summer Olympics
 Steph Elliott (Collingwood) – defender for England women's team
 Tessa Howard (Castle) – midfielder for England women's team
 Ollie Payne – represented Great Britain at the 2020 Summer Olympics
 Sean Rowlands – represented Great Britain at the 1992 Summer Olympics in Barcelona
 Rui Saldanha (Hatfield) – represented Great Britain at the 1972 Summer Olympics
 Rhys Smith (St Mary's) – midfielder for England national team
 Jack Turner – forward for England national team
 Jack Waller (Hild Bede) – defender for England and Great Britain

Rowers
 Simon Barr (Hatfield)
 Colin Barratt
 Roger Brown (Hild Bede)
 Andy Butt
 James Clarke (Cuths)
 Philippa Cross
 Suzie Ellis (Trevs)
 Angus Groom (Hatfield)
 Will Fletcher (Hild Bede)
 Alice Freeman (Hatfield)
 Lucinda Gooderham (Hild Bede)
 Wade Hall-Craggs (Grey)
 Naomi Hoogesteger (Hild Bede)
 David Hosking (Grey)
 Tracy Langlands (St Mary's)
 Ian Lawson (Cuths)
 Lindsey Maguire (Ustinov)
 Callum McBrierty (St John's)
 Malindi Myers
 Louisa Reeve (Hatfield)
 Matt Rossiter (Cuths)
 Peter Rudge (Van Mildert)
 Emily Taylor (Hatfield)
 Kim Thomas
 Lily van den Broecke (Castle)

Rugby players
 

 Toby Allchurch (Hatfield) – participated in 1979 England rugby union tour of Japan, Fiji and Tonga
 Josh Beaumont (St. Aidan's) – Sale Sharks and England national rugby union team player
 Mark Bailey (Hild Bede) – former English national rugby union player, Professor of Later Medieval History at the University of East Anglia
 David Barnes – Bath Rugby prop
 Richard Breakey (Hatfield) – Scotland rugby player
 Adam Brocklebank (Collingwood) – Newcastle Falcons prop
 Jeremy Campbell-Lamerton (Hatfield) – former Scottish rugby union lock
 Will Carling (Hatfield) – rugby union player for Harlequin F.C., former captain of the England national rugby union team (1988–1996)
 Fran Clough (Collingwood) – England rugby player
 Jon Dunbar – Scotland flanker
 Phil de Glanville (Castle) – former captain of the England national rugby union team
 P.J. Dixon (Grey) – Captain of England Rugby Union Team 1972; as an uncapped player, played in the Lions' first Test victories against New Zealand in 1971, scoring a try in the 14–14 draw at Eden Park
 Maurice Fitzgerald, England A and Biarritz prop
 Will Greenwood (Hatfield) – England rugby playerWill Greenwood.co.uk, accessed 18 May 2009
 Simon Hammersley – Sale Sharks fullback
 Charlie Hannaford (Hatfield) – England rugby player
 Duncan Hodge – Scotland full back
 Charlie Hodgson – England rugby player
 Ed Kalman – Scotland prop
 Heather Kerr (St Mary's) – represented England at 2017 Women's Rugby World Cup
 Peter Lillington (Hatfield) – participated in 1981 Scotland rugby union tour of New Zealand
 Stuart Legg (Hatfield) – former rugby union full-back for Newcastle Falcons and Treviso
 Claudia MacDonald – England women scrum-half
 Alan Old – England international and British and Irish Lion, participated in 1974 South Africa tour
 Ollie Phillips (Van Mildert) – captained England sevens
 Sean Robinson – second row for Newcastle Falcons
 Marcus Rose (Hatfield) – England rugby union international full back
 Peter Rossborough (Bede) – former England rugby fullback
 Andy Mullins (Hatfield) – England rugby player
 Ben Stevenson – wing for Newcastle Falcons
 Tim Stimpson (Grey) – rugby union player and England international (1996–2002)
 Rob Vickers – Newcastle Falcons hooker
 Dave Walder (Hatfield) – rugby union footballer, fly-half for the Mitsubishi Sagamihara DynaBoars in Japan
 Peter Warfield (Hatfield) – England rugby player
 Ben Woods (Hatfield) – former rugby union player who played for Newcastle Falcons and Leicester Tigers as an openside flanker

Runners
 Mark Hudspith (Hatfield) – long-distance runner, 1994 Commonwealth Games medallist
 Colin Kirkham (Cuths) – marathon runner, competed at 1972 Summer Olympics
 Rahul Mehta (S. Mary's) – Indian long-distance runner, most famous for his victory in the 2001 Great North Run
 Jon Solly (Hatfield) – long-distance runner, 1986 Commonwealth Games champion

Tennis players
 Mallory Cecil (St Mary's)
 Henry Patten
 Romana Tabak
 Finn Tearney
 Julius Tverijonas
 Filip Veger

Other sports people

 Peter Elleray (Collingwood) – Formula One and Le Mans Race Car designer
 Katharine Ford (Hatfield) – 4 times world-record holding Ultracyclist and the first ever Briton to ride for 12 Hours or more on an Indoor Velodrome and Static bicycle
 Shirin Gerami – first Iranian woman triathlete
 Michael Knighton (Cuths) – Chairman of Carlisle United F.C.
 Eli Schenkel (born 1992) - Canadian Olympic fencer
 Robert Swan (St Chad's) – Honorary Fellow of St Chad's, Explorer – the first person to reach both the South and North Pole on foot
 Jock Wishart (Bede) – set a new world record for circumnavigation of the globe in a powered vessel and organising the Polar Race

 Writers 
Authors

 Poppy Adams (Hatfield) – novelist
 Russell Ash (Cuths) – author of Top 10 of Everything Oliver Balch (Hatfield) - travel writer
 Simi Bedford – Nigerian novelist
 John Blackburn (King's) – thriller writer
 Edward Bradley (Castle) – novelist and clergyman known by the pen name Cuthbert M. Bede; author of The Adventures of Mr. Verdant Green Bill Bryson – writer and former University Chancellor
 Barbara Cleverly – author of mystery novels
 William Farquhar Conton – Sierra Leonean author best known for The African
 Tim FitzHigham (St Chad's) – award-winning British comedian, author, and world record holder
 Stephen Davies (Collingwood) – children's author
 Mark Elliott (Collingwood) – travel writer
 Justin Hill (Cuths) – award-winning young author
 Lorna Hill (St Mary's) – children's writer, author of the Sadlers Wells series
 Baret Magarian (Castle) – novelist and freelance journalist
 Allan Mallinson (St Chad's) – military historian and author of the Matthew Hervey novels
 Guy Mankowski – author
 Alice Oseman - novelist
 Katharine Preston (Hatfield) – author and public speaker
 Rosa Rankin-Gee (Hatfield) - novelist
 Ernest Raymond (Unattached) – novelist
 Mary Stewart (Hild) – novelist
 Patrick Tilley – science fiction author (The Amtrak Wars)
 Dan van der Vat (Cuths) – journalist, author
 Annabel Venning (Castle) – journalist, author
 Minette Walters (Trevs) – bestselling author and crime writer
 Peter Watson (Castle) – journalist, author
 Charles Gidley Wheeler – screenwriter (The Sandbaggers) and novelist

Journalists

 George Arbuthnott – investigative journalist
 Tim Atkin (Castle) – wine correspondent
 Katy Balls – deputy political editor of The Spectator Peter Cadogan – writer and protester
 Dominic Carman (Hatfield) – journalist and Liberal Democrat politician
 Benjamin Cook (Collingwood) – journalist and author
 Adrian Dannatt (Chads) – child actor, artist and journalist
 Hunter Davies (Castle) – journalist and author of The Beatles: The Only Authorised Biography Jonny Dymond – BBC journalist
 Harold Evans (Castle) – journalist; former editor of The Sunday Times and The Times; author of The American Century Nigel Farndale (Grad Soc) – writer in the Sunday Telegraph Jonah Fisher (Collingwood) – BBC journalist
 Alexander Frater (Hatfield) – travel writer, journalist
 Tom Harwood (St Mary's) - journalist, political commentator
 Annabel Heseltine (St Mary's) – editor of School House Magazine Graham Hancock (Cuths) – co-editor of New Internationalist magazine, 1976–1979; East Africa correspondent of The Economist, 1981–1983
 Andrew Holgate – Literary Editor, The Sunday Times John Kay (Hatfield) – former chief reporter with The Sun
 Christopher Lamb – Rome correspondent for The Tablet Colin McDowell (Hatfield) – fashion writer and journalist
 Andrew Norfolk – chief investigative reporter for The Times, known for work exposing the Rotherham child sexual exploitation scandal
 Sebastian Payne (Van Mildert) – journalist
 Martin Pengelly (Van Mildert) – Weekend editor of Guardian US
 Manveen Rana – reporter, Today Programme Jeremy Vine (Hatfield) – journalist and early member of The Durham Revue
 Jonathan Wilson – football journalist, founder and editor of The Blizzard

Poets, dramatists and translators
 Richard Caddel – poet, publisher and editor
 Julia Copus (St Mary's) – poet, children's writer and biographer, winner of the Forward Prize for Best Single Poem and the National Poetry Competition
 James Kirkup (Grey) – travel writer, poet, novelist, playwright, translator, broadcaster, Hon. Fellow Grey College from 1992
 Liz Lefroy (St Mary's) – poet, winner of Roy Fisher prize (2011)
 Alan Plater (King's) – playwright and TV writer
 Tina Kover (Ustinov) – translator
 Rachel McCarthy (Castle) – poet, critic and broadcaster
 David Mercer (King's) – English playwright and dramatist
 Michael O'Neill – poet and academic

Miscellaneous
 Dave Anderson (Collingwood) – cartoon and animation writer
 Lucy Beresford (Trevs) – writer, psychotherapist and media commentator
 David J. Bodycombe (Trevs) – puzzle-writer
 John Galbraith Graham (St Chad's) – crossword compiler, "Araucaria" of The Guardian''; Chaplain and tutor at St Chad's 1949–52
 Joseph Stevenson (Castle) – English Catholic archivist

Explorers 

 Stephanie Solomonides, first Cypriot to reach both the North and South Poles

Other Notable people

 Stephen Bicknell (St Chad's) – leading British organ builder and lecturer at the Royal Academy of Music
 Patrick Carter, Baron Carter of Coles (Hatfield) – Chairman of Sport England (2002–06)
 E. C. B. Corlett – naval architect and consultant, pivotal in the restoration of the SS Great Britain
 Sarah Everard (St Cuthbert's) – marketing executive murdered by a Metropolitan Police officer on 4 March 2021
 Sir Terry Farrell (King's) – architect (the MI6 Building, Charing Cross railway station, KK100, Shenzhen)
 Katharine Gun (St Mary's) – former translator for GCHQ and whistle-blower of information concerning USA activities in their push for the 2003 invasion of Iraq
 Dame Elisabeth Hoodless (King's) – Executive Director of Community Service Volunteers
 Julian Knight – Chairman and Chief Executive Officer of climate change campaign Global Cool
 Jack Lynn (King's) – architect
 Ian McCafferty (Van Mildert) – member of the Bank of England's Monetary Policy Committee
 David Rock (King's) – architect RIBA President 1997-99
 Gordon Ryder (King's) – architect
 Thomas Sharp – town planner, academic in the School of Architecture at King's College 1937–1945, president of the Town Planning Institute
 Tim Smit (Hatfield) – horticulturalist and creator of the Eden Project
 Alison and Peter Smithson (King's) – pioneers of brutalist architecture
 Michael Spurr (St Chad's) – Director of Operations, HM Prison Service
 David Walton (Van Mildert) – economist, member of the Bank of England's Monetary Policy Committee
 Rupert Whitaker (Hild Bede) – founder and chairman of the Tuke Institute; co-founder of the Terence Higgins Trust
 Sir William Whitfield (King's) – architect
 Assistant Commissioner Robert Beckley (University) - Police Officer

Notes

References

 
 
Durham